Charles Agar, 1st Earl of Normanton (22 December 1736 – 14 July 1809), was an Anglo-Irish clergyman of the Church of Ireland. He served as Dean of Kilmore, as Bishop of Cloyne, as Archbishop of Cashel, and finally as Archbishop of Dublin from 1801 until his death.

Early life
Agar was the third son of Henry Agar of Gowran in County Kilkenny and his wife Anne Ellis, daughter of the Most Reverend Welbore Ellis, Bishop of Meath. His brothers included James Agar, 1st Viscount Clifden, and Welbore Ellis Agar, a notable art collector.

Welbore Ellis, 1st Baron Mendip, was his maternal uncle.

Agar was educated at Westminster School and Christ Church, Oxford, where he matriculated on 31 May 1755, aged 18. He graduated BA in 1759, promoted by seniority to MA in 1762. On 31 December 1765, he was created a Doctor of Civil Law.

Career
Agar is known to have held particularly marked Calvinistic positions. He served as Dean of Kilmore from 1765 to 1768, and then as Bishop of Cloyne until 1779.

In 1776 he married Jane Benson, a daughter of William Benson, of Downpatrick, County Down. In 1779 he was appointed as Archbishop of Cashel and also joined the Irish Privy Council. 
In 1784, while he was in office, the new St. John's Cathedral, Cashel, was completed, and two years later its important Samuel Green organ was built.

In 1794 Agar was raised to the Peerage of Ireland as Baron Somerton. In 1801, he was translated to become Archbishop of Dublinand was created Viscount Somerton. In 1806 he was further honoured when he was made Earl of Normanton. These titles were all in the Peerage of Ireland. He remained as archbishop of Dublin until his death in 1809, and from the beginning of 1801 onwards sat in the House of Lords as one of the twenty-eight original Irish Representative Peers, following the Acts of Union 1800 which united Ireland and Great Britain.

Archbishop Normanton died in July 1809, aged 72, and was succeeded in his secular titles by his son Welbore Ellis Agar. He is buried in the north transept of Westminster Abbey; his widow Jane, Countess of Normanton, was buried alongside him following her death in 1826. His tomb dates from 1815 and was created by John Bacon.

References

Citations

Sources

 

|-

1736 births
1809 deaths
Alumni of Christ Church, Oxford
Anglican archbishops of Cashel
Anglican archbishops of Dublin
Anglican bishops of Cloyne
Deans of Kilmore
Irish representative peers
Members of the Irish House of Lords
Members of the Privy Council of Ireland
Ordained peers
Peers of Ireland created by George III
People educated at Westminster School, London
People from County Kilkenny
Irish Anglican archbishops
Earls of Normanton